Ernest Holford "Dud" Lee (August 22, 1899 – January 7, 1971) was a backup infielder in Major League Baseball, playing mainly as a shortstop from  through  for the St. Louis Browns (1920–21) and Boston Red Sox (1924–26). He was born in Denver, Colorado. While with the Browns, he played under the name Dud or Ernest Dudley in 1920–21.

In a five-season career, Lee was a .223 hitter (163-for-732) with 80 runs and 60 RBI in 253 games, including 20 doubles, nine triples, 12 stolen bases, and a .311 on-base percentage. He did not hit a home run. He made 241 infield appearances at shortstop (208), second base (30) and third base (3), committing 88 errors in 1,278 chances for a collective .931 fielding percentage.

Lee died in his homeland of Denver, Colorado, at age 71.

External links

Retrosheet

Boston Red Sox players
St. Louis Browns players
Major League Baseball shortstops
Major League Baseball infielders
Baseball players from Denver
1899 births
1971 deaths